Mauri is a 1988 New Zealand film directed by Merata Mita. It is a significant work of indigenous filmmaking, and of New Zealand filmmaking in general.

Synopsis
A woman lives in a basic dwelling with fire in the hearth where she cooks. We get an insight in the family in this saga, where troubles are met with kindness, except by the British or those that have gone across to their side.

Cast

Reviews
 2001 - -France 
 2019 - Venice Classics 
 2019 - Aussie and Kiwi Film Festival Prague 
 2020 - Hawaii International Film Festival
 2020 - San Diego Asian Film Festival
 2021 - imagineNATIVE Film and Media Arts Festival National Indigenous Month Programme

References

External links

1970s New Zealand films
1979 films
Films set in New Zealand
Films shot in New Zealand
New Zealand drama films